Khuda Dekh Raha Hai() is a Pakistani drama serial directed by Sabiha Sumar of Khamosh Pani fame and produced by Sadia Jabbar. It is written by Shahzad Javed (Currently Assistant Vice President Content, HUM TV, Pakistan). The serial stars Sajal Aly and Agha Ali in lead roles along with Qazi Wajid, Bushra Ansari, Imran Aslam and Asad Siddiqui in supporting roles. The serial originally aired on A-Plus Entertainment from 19 February 2015 to 2 July 2015 with a total of 20 episodes.

At 15th Lux Style Awards it received two nominations including, Best TV Actress for Aly and Best TV Director for Sumar.

Overview
The show entails the sensitive issue of manipulating the people's lives in the name of religion.

Cast
Imran Aslam as Adnan
 Sajal Aly as Zoya 
 Agha Ali as Junaid 
 Qazi Wajid as Akhtar 
 Bushra Ansari as Khalida 
 Asad Siddiqui as Moiz
 Faryal Mehmood as Sana
 Mehmood Akhtar as mujeeb ur rehman adnan's father
 Sana Askari as Sanam
 Parveen Akbar as Sanam's mother
 Qaiser Naqvi as Aapa Jan
 Pareeza Hashmi

Production
Earlier,  the show was titled as Istikhara (استخارہ) but later it was changed to Khuda Dekh Raha Hai.

Apart from acting, Agha also sang the OST of the serial. It was the second on-screen appearance of Sajal Aly and Agha Ali after drama serial Kis Se Kahoon.

Broadcast 
 In 2015, the show was rebroadcast in Pakistan on ATV (Pakistan) by the title Amal(عمل).
 It premiered again on A-Plus Entertainment on 30 January 2017 at 10:00pm slot. 
 It aired on B4U PLUS of B4U Network in India and Middle East with the same title.

Awards
The drama received two nominations at 15th Lux Style Awards.

References

External links
 

Pakistani drama television series
Urdu-language telenovelas
2015 Pakistani television series debuts
2014 Pakistani television series endings
2015 Pakistani television series endings
A-Plus TV original programming